Vexillum alboglobulatum is a species of sea snail, a marine gastropod mollusk, in the family Costellariidae, the ribbed miters.

Distribution
This marine species occurs off the Philippines.

References

 Salisbury, R. A. & Gori, S. (2019). A rare mitriform gastropod from the Philippines (Gastropoda: Costellariidae). Acta Conchyliorum. 18: 3–6.

alboglobulatum
Gastropods described in 2019